Promise (You and Me) is a pop rock single by the German band Reamonn. The song was written by Rea Garvey, Uwe Bossert, Mike Gommeringer, Philipp Rauenbusch and Sebastian Padotzke.

Track listing

Charts

References

Reamonn songs
2006 singles